Dicolectes aulicus is a species of leaf beetle of West Africa and the Democratic Republic of the Congo. It was first described from Assinie by Édouard Lefèvre in 1886.

References 

Eumolpinae
Beetles of the Democratic Republic of the Congo
Taxa named by Édouard Lefèvre
Beetles described in 1886
Insects of West Africa